Highway 295 (AR 295, Ark. 295, and Hwy. 295) is a designation for four north–south state highways in Madison County. One segment of  runs from the Ozark National Forest north to Highway 16 at Crosses. A second segment of  runs northeast from Combs to Madison County Road 4554 (CR 4554). A fourth segment of  begins at Highway 74 at Wesley and runs north to US Route 412 (US 412).

Route description

Ozark National Forest to Crosses
The route runs north from County Road 4035 at Brannon in the Ozark National Forest to Highway 16 at Crosses, where it terminates. The route does not intersect any other state highways.

Combs to CR 5445
Highway 295 begins at Highway 16 at Combs and runs northeast until state maintenance ends and the highway continues as County Road 5445. The route parallels Greasy Creek during its entire length and does not intersect any other state highways.

Japton to Drake's Creek
Highway 295 begins at County Road 5395 at Japton and runs northwest. The route passes through Georgetown before a junction with Highway 74 at Drake's Creek, where it terminates. The route does not intersect any other state highways.

Wesley to US 412
Highway 295 begins at Highway 74 at Wesley and runs north to intersect Highway 45 near Hindsville. The highway continues north to terminate at U.S. Route 412.

History
Highway 295 was added to the state highway system as part of a large transfer of county roads to the state system that took place on April 24, 1963. Initially only the portion from Highway 74 to Highway 68 (which later became US 412) was transferred to state maintenance. The sections of Highway 295 running northeast from Combs and southeast from Highway 74 were added to the state highway system on November 23, 1966. The Brannon to Crosses segment was commissioned on June 28, 1973.

Major intersections

Former Hindsville spur

Highway 295 Spur (AR 295S, Ark. 295S or Hwy. 295S) was a short east–west spur route in Madison County. It ran east from Highway 295 to US 412 in Hindsville. The route was deleted on March 18, 2009 following the rerouting of U.S. Route 412 around Hindsville. The route was extended to the new alignment of US 412 upon its completion.

See also

References

External links

295
Transportation in Madison County, Arkansas